The 1996–97 Elitserien was the 63rd season of the top division of Swedish handball. 12 teams competed in the league. The league was split into an autumn league and a spring league. The eight highest placed teams in the autumn league qualified for the spring league. HK Drott won the regular season, but Redbergslids IK won the playoffs and claimed their 16th Swedish title.

League tables

Autumn

Spring

Playoffs

Quarterfinals
IFK Skövde–LUGI HF 30–32
LUGI HF–IFK Skövde 26–16
Lugi HF won series 2–0

IF Guif–IFK Kristianstad 25–23
IFK Kristianstad–IF Guif 28–35
IF Guif won series 2–0

Semifinals
HK Drott–IF Guif 31–33
IF Guif–HK Drott 31–30
IF Guif won series 2–0

Redbergslids IK–LUGI HF 30–22
LUGI HF–Redbergslids IK 18–24
Redbergslids IK won series 2–0

Finals
Redbergslids IK–IF Guif 27–21
IF Guif–Redbergslids IK 19–26
Redbergslids IK–IF Guif 35–23
Redbergslids IK won series 3–0

References 

Swedish handball competitions